La Mitis is a regional county municipality in the Bas-Saint-Laurent region in eastern Quebec, Canada on the Gaspé peninsula. It is named for the Mitis River (The Mitis) which has its source in the region (at Lac Inférieur) and flows through the central part of the region before emptying into the Saint Lawrence River.

The county seat is in Mont-Joli.

Subdivisions 
There are 18 subdivisions within the RCM:

Cities & Towns (2)
 Métis-sur-Mer
 Mont-Joli

Municipalities (6)
 Grand-Métis
 Les Hauteurs
 Padoue
 Sainte-Angèle-de-Mérici
 Sainte-Luce
 Saint-Gabriel-de-Rimouski

Parishes (7)
 La Rédemption
 Saint-Charles-Garnier
 Saint-Donat
 Sainte-Flavie
 Sainte-Jeanne-d'Arc
 Saint-Joseph-de-Lepage
 Saint-Octave-de-Métis

Villages (1)
 Price

Unorganized Territory (2)
 Lac-à-la-Croix
 Lac-des-Eaux-Mortes

Demographics

Population

Language

Transportation

Access routes 
Highways and numbered routes that run through the municipality, including external routes that start or finish at the county border:

Autoroutes

Principal Highways

Secondary Highways

External Routes
None

See also 
 List of regional county municipalities and equivalent territories in Quebec
 Seignory of Lac-Mitis
 Mitis Seignory

References

External links 

Regional county municipalities in Bas-Saint-Laurent
Census divisions of Quebec